Werner Lohrer (March 4, 1917 – 1991)  was an ice hockey player for the Swiss national team. He won a bronze medal at the 1948 Winter Olympics. He was a brother of Heini Lohrer.

References 

1917 births
1991 deaths
EHC Arosa players
Ice hockey players at the 1948 Winter Olympics
Olympic bronze medalists for Switzerland
Olympic ice hockey players of Switzerland
Olympic medalists in ice hockey
People from Plessur District
Medalists at the 1948 Winter Olympics
Sportspeople from Graubünden